The 1982–83 Washington State Cougars men's basketball team represented Washington State University for the 1982–83 NCAA Division I men's basketball season. Led by eleventh-year head coach George Raveling, the Cougars were members of the Pacific-10 Conference and played their home games on campus at Beasley Coliseum in Pullman, Washington.

There was no conference tournament this season; it debuted four years later. They had a chance to tie the Bruins for the title, but lost by a point to rival Washington in Seattle to end the regular season.

After missing it the previous two seasons, WSU was invited to the 52-team NCAA tournament and were seeded eighth in the West region; they met ninth seed Weber State, the Big Sky champion, in the first round in Boise. WSU's only two non-conference losses were to Big Sky teams, neighbor Idaho and Montana, both on the road in December. The Cougars defeated Weber by ten points.

The next opponent was the top seed in the West, #4 Virginia with center Ralph Sampson, who had a first-round bye.  stayed with the Cavaliers, but lost by five points.

Washington State's 23–7 record was their best in 42 years, since the national runner-up team of 1941 went 

Raveling was the Pac-10 coach of the year and the national runner-up for AP coach of the year. 
In early April, he left Pullman to succeed Lute Olsen at Iowa in the Big Ten Conference; assistant Len Stevens was quickly promoted to 

A third-round selection the 1983 NBA draft, senior guard/forward Craig Ehlo had a fourteen-year career in the NBA.

WSU's next NCAA appearance was eleven years away in 1994, under head coach Kelvin Sampson.

The court surface at Beasley Coliseum was tartan (polyurethane) for its first decade and this was its final season; a traditional hardwood floor debuted at the start of the next season.

Postseason results

|-
!colspan=6 style=| NCAA Tournament

References

External links
Sports Reference – Washington State Cougars: 1982–83 basketball season

Washington State Cougars men's basketball seasons
Washington State Cougars
Washington State
Washington State
Washington State